Fozil Musaev , also called Fozil Musayev, (born 2 January 1989) is an Uzbekistani footballer. He plays for Júbilo Iwata and the Uzbekistan national team as a midfielder.

Career
In 2007-2008 he played for Nasaf Qarshi. On 4 January 2013 Bunyodkor announced signing of Fozil Musaev.

On 19 July 2013, Musaev signed one-year deal with Qatari club Muaither SC.

International career
Musaev has represented Uzbekistan at several international levels. He played for Uzbekistan U-19 in the 2008 AFC U-19 Championship. In 2011, he played for Uzbekistan U-22 and 2012 for Uzbekistan U-23 in qualification matches for 2012 Summer Olympics.

He played his first match for the main national team on 1 February 2009, in a friendly match against Azerbaijan ended with 1–1.

Club career
 Last Update: 9 March 2016

Honors
Nasaf Qarshi
 Uzbek League runner-up: 2011
 Uzbekistan Cup runner-up: 2012
 AFC Cup: 2011

Lokomotiv Tashkent
Uzbekistan Cup: 2014

Sepahan
Iran Pro League (1): 2014–15

References

External links
 

 Fozil Musaev at  Goal.com

1989 births
Living people
Uzbekistani footballers
Uzbekistani expatriate footballers
FC Bunyodkor players
Muaither SC players
Sepahan S.C. footballers
FC Nasaf players
Júbilo Iwata players
Footballers at the 2010 Asian Games
Footballers at the 2014 Asian Games
Association football defenders
Association football midfielders
Qatar Stars League players
Persian Gulf Pro League players
2019 AFC Asian Cup players
Uzbekistani expatriate sportspeople in Qatar
Expatriate footballers in Qatar
Uzbekistani expatriate sportspeople in Iran
Expatriate footballers in Iran
Asian Games competitors for Uzbekistan
AFC Cup winning players
Uzbekistan international footballers